Laundry day or variation, may refer to:

 A day to do laundry
 Laundry Day (film), a 2016 U.S. film
 Laundry Day (band), a U.S. band formed in 2017
 "Laundry Day" (song), a Weird Al Yankovic song cut from the 1999 album Bad Hair Day
 "Laundry Day" (song), a 2016 Mac Miller song, see Mac Miller production discography
 "Laundry Day" (song), a 2017 Nottz song, see Nottz production discography
 Laundry Day (TV series), a South Korean TV show on OnStyle
 "Laundry Day" (episode), a season 1 episode of Masha and the Bear
 "Laundry Day" (episode), a 1993 episode of The Vacant Lot
 "Laundry Day" (episode), a 2003 episode of The Weekenders, see List of The Weekenders episodes
 "Laundry Day" (episode), a 2013 episode of Teen Titans Go!, see List of Teen Titans Go! episodes
 "Laundry Day!" (episode), a 2012 episode of The Aquabats! Super Show!, see List of The Aquabats! Super Show! episodes
 "It's Laundry Day!" (episode), an episode of Crayon Shin-chan, see List of Crayon Shin-chan episodes
 "It's Laundry Day!" (episode), a 2013 episode of Splatalot

See also

 Day (disambiguation)